The siege of Nicaea of 1113 occurred in the course of the Byzantine-Seljuk wars.

Following the success of the First Crusade and the failure of the Crusade of 1101, the Seljuq Turks resumed their offensive operations against the Byzantines. Emperor Alexios I Komnenos, suffering from old age, was unable to deal with the swift Turkish raids into what was left of Byzantine Anatolia. However, the Seljuk Sultanate of Rum was finally brought to battle when it unsuccessfully laid siege to Nicaea.

References

Notes

Nicaea 1113
Sieges of the Byzantine–Seljuk wars
Nicaea 1113
Nicaea
Conflicts in 1113
History of Bursa Province
Nicaea
1113 in Asia
1110s in the Byzantine Empire
Byzantine Bithynia